The D.I.C.E. Award for Immersive Reality Technical Achievement is an award presented annually by the Academy of Interactive Arts & Sciences during the academy's annual D.I.C.E. Awards. "This award celebrates the highest level of technical achievement within an immersive reality experience through the combined attention to gameplay engineering and visual engineering. Elements honored include but are not limited to technology features specifically associated with the immersive medium, artificial intelligence, physics, engine mechanics, and visual engineering."

The most recent winner was Red Matter 2, which was developed and published by Vertical Robot.

Winners and nominees

2010s

2020s

Multiple nominations and wins

Developers and publishers 
Oculus Studios, known as Reality Labs, has published the most nominees, so far, and is the only publisher, so far, with multiple wins. Ready at Dawn is the only developer so far to have developed multiple winners, let alone nominees.

Franchises
Lone Echo is the only franchise so far to have won more than once.

References 

D.I.C.E. Awards
Awards established in 2017